Concordia Sports Hall is an indoor arena in Chiajna, Romania.

References

External links
 Photo 1
 Photo 2

Indoor arenas in Romania
Basketball venues in Romania 
Chiajna